The Second Andrews ministry  was the 70th ministry of the Government of Victoria. The Labor government, led by Premier Daniel Andrews and Deputy Premier James Merlino, was officially sworn in on 29 November 2018, following the party's second consecutive victory at the 2018 state election, which was held on 24 November 2018. 

At the time of its formation the ministry consisted of 22 ministers, eleven of whom were women, making it the first cabinet in Victoria's history to reach gender parity. To accommodate this change Philip Dalidakis was removed from his cabinet position, although his work as a minister was praised by Andrews. Following the resignation of Gavin Jennings and the appointment of Ros Spence on 23 March 2020, the Cabinet became majority female.

The Second Andrews ministry succeeded the First Andrews ministry, and was succeeded by the Third Andrews ministry.

Second Andrews ministry, 2018–2022

June 2022–October 2022
A cabinet reshuffle was undertaken in June 2022 after five cabinet ministers had announced their upcoming retirement at the November state election: James Merlino, Martin Foley, Lisa Neville, Martin Pakula and Richard Wynne.

Lizzie Blandthorn, Colin Brooks, Steve Dimopoulos, Sonya Kilkenny and Harriet Shing were appointed to the ministry to replace the retiring ministers. The rearranged ministry was sworn in on 27 June. Kilkenny was sworn in a week later on 4 July as she had contracted COVID-19 and had to isolate prior to the original swearing-in ceremony.

There were also two new ministerial roles created to oversee the 2026 Commonwealth Games to be held in the state.

June 2020–June 2022
On 15 June 2020, Adem Somyurek was dismissed from the ministry due to alleged misconduct, with Robin Scott and Marlene Kairouz also resigning the next day. A reshuffle took place on 22 June 2020, bringing Shaun Leane, Danny Pearson and Natalie Hutchins into cabinet and reassigning several portfolios. Hutchins was previously a minister in the First Andrews Ministry.

On 26 September 2020, health minister Jenny Mikakos resigned as minister, following Premier Daniel Andrews stating in the board of inquiry into the hotel quarantine program, that he regarded Mikakos "accountable" for the program. Minister for Mental Health Martin Foley was sworn in as the new health and ambulance services minister later that day. A further reshuffle three days later on 29 September 2020 added Ingrid Stitt into the cabinet and the reassignment of some portfolios.

On 16 December 2020, Jill Hennessy announced she would step down from the role of Attorney-General effective immediately to spend more time with her family, but would stay in Parliament and recontest her seat at the 2022 election. She was replaced as Attorney-General by Jaclyn Symes. Mary-Anne Thomas was added to the cabinet and was appointed Minister for Regional Development and Minister for Agriculture.

In February 2021, Lisa Neville was admitted to hospital and was forced to take leave due to Chron's disease. She returned to work in August 2021. The nature of her emergency services portfolio required regular travel around to remote parts of the state at short notice, which was not suitable with her medical condition. Therefore, Neville relinquished the portfolio to Attorney-General Jaclyn Symes. Symes relinquished her resources portfolio to Jaala Pulford.

On 11 October 2021, Luke Donnellan resigned as minister, following the first day of the IBAC investigation Operation Watts. Donnellan claims that he never misused public funds but that he had previously breached party rules as Minister. He was replaced by Anthony Carbines on 6 December 2021.

November 2018–June 2020
The first arrangement of the Second Andrews ministry was sworn in on 29 November 2018.

Gavin Jennings resigned from Parliament and the ministry on 23 March 2020. He was replaced in cabinet by Ros Spence.

Crisis Council of Cabinet
The Crisis Council of Cabinet was established on 3 April 2020 as a response to the COVID-19 pandemic. It consists of the premier and seven ministers who were all sworn in via video conference. The Crisis Council of Cabinet and its positions were abolished in November that year.

References

External links
 Ministers, Parliament of Victoria

Cabinets established in 2018
Victoria (Australia) ministries
2018 establishments in Australia
Australian Labor Party ministries in Victoria (Australia)
Ministries of Elizabeth II
Ministries of Charles III